This is a list of 112 species in Saldula, a genus of shore bugs in the family Saldidae.

Saldula species

 Saldula ablusa Drake & Hottes, 1954 i c g b
 Saldula ambigua Lindskog, 1985 i c g
 Saldula amoena (Reuter, 1876) i c g
 Saldula amplicollis (Reuter, 1891) i c g
 Saldula andrei Drake, 1949 i c g
 Saldula arenicola (Scholtz, 1847) i c g
 Saldula arsenjevi Vinokurov, 1981 i c g
 Saldula balli Drake, 1950 i c g
 Saldula basingeri Drake, 1949 i c g
 Saldula bengali Cobben, 1986 i c g
 Saldula boninana Drake, 1961 i c g
 Saldula bouchervillei (Provancher, 1872) i c g
 Saldula brevicornis Rimes, 1951 i c g
 Saldula burmanica Lindskog, 1975 i c g
 Saldula c-album (Fieber, 1859) i c g
 Saldula chartoscirtoides Cobben, 1986 i c g
 Saldula comata (Champion, 1900) i c g
 Saldula comatula Parshley, 1923 i c g
 Saldula confluenta (Say, 1832) i c g
 Saldula connemarae Walton, 1986 i c g
 Saldula coorongensis Rimes, 1951 i c g
 Saldula coxalis (Stål, 1873) i c g
 Saldula cygni (Kirkaldy, 1899) i c g
 Saldula dentulata (Hodgden, 1949) i c g
 Saldula differata Drake and Carvalho, 1948 i c g
 Saldula dispersa (Uhler, 1893) i c g
 Saldula durangoana J. Polhemus, 1972 i c g
 Saldula explanata (Uhler, 1893) i c g
 Saldula exulans (White, 1878) i c g
 Saldula filippii Cobben, 1987 i c g
 Saldula fucicola (Sahlberg, 1871) i c g
 Saldula fukiena Drake and Maa, 1954 i c g
 Saldula galapagosana J. Polhemus, 1968 i c g
 Saldula gidshaensis Cobben, 1987 i c g
 Saldula gilloglyi J. Polhemus and D. Polhemus, 2006 i c g
 Saldula guamensis Drake and Hottes, 1950 i c g
 Saldula hasegawai Cobben, 1985 i c g
 Saldula inconspicua Cobben, 1987 i c g
 Saldula inoana Drake, 1961 i c g
 Saldula intermedia Cobben, 1980 i c g
 Saldula javanica (Jaczewski, 1935) i c g
 Saldula katonai Drake and Hoberlandt, 1950 i c g
 Saldula kauaiensis Cobben, 1980 i c g
 Saldula kurentzovi Vinokurov, 1979 i c g
 Saldula laevis (Champion, 1900) i c g
 Saldula laticollis (Reuter, 1875) i c g
 Saldula lattini Chapman and J. Polhemus, 1965 i c g
 Saldula lindbergi Lindskog, 1975 i c g
 Saldula lindskogi Vinokurov, 2004 i c g
 Saldula lita Drake, 1961 i c g
 Saldula lomata J. Polhemus, 1985 i c g b
 Saldula longicornis Cobben, 1980 i c g
 Saldula luctuosa (Stål, 1859) i c g
 Saldula luteola Lindskog and J. Polhemus, 1992 i c g
 Saldula madagascariensis Cobben, 1987 i c g
 Saldula mariae Vinokurov, 1978 i c g
 Saldula melanoscela (Fieber, 1859) i c g
 Saldula misis Seidenstücker, 1964 i c g
 Saldula montana Cobben and J. Polhemus, 1966 i c g
 Saldula montensis Cobben, 1987 i c g
 Saldula montigena Cobben, 1987 i c g
 Saldula montivaga Cobben, 1987 i c g
 Saldula nicholsoni (Hale, 1924) i c g
 Saldula nigrita Parshley, 1921 i c g
 Saldula nitidula (Puton, 1880) g
 Saldula niveolimbata (Reuter, 1900) i c g
 Saldula nobilis (Horváth, 1883) i c g
 Saldula notalis Drake, 1950 g
 Saldula notera Drake, 1963 i c g
 Saldula nubigena (Kirkaldy, 1908) i c g
 Saldula oahuensis (Blackburn, 1888) i c g
 Saldula opacula (Zetterstedt, 1838) i c g b
 Saldula opiparia Drake and Hottes, 1955 i c g
 Saldula orbiculata (Uhler, 1877) i c g b
 Saldula orthochila (Fieber, 1859) i c g
 Saldula palauana Drake, 1961 i c g
 Saldula pallipes (Fabricius, 1794) i c g b
 Saldula palustris (Douglas, 1874) i c g
 Saldula parens Cobben, 1986 i c g
 Saldula penningtoni Drake and Carvalho, 1948 i c g
 Saldula pericarti Vinokurov, 2012 i c g
 Saldula pexa Drake, 1950 i c g
 Saldula pilosella (Thomson, 1871) i c g
 Saldula procellaris (Kirkaldy, 1908) i c g
 Saldula pruinosa Cobben, 1987 i c g
 Saldula psammobia Rimes, 1951 i c g
 Saldula quadrilineata (Jakovlev, 1865) i c g
 Saldula recticollis (Horváth, 1899) i c g
 Saldula reuteriella (Kirkaldy, 1899) i c g
 Saldula robertusingeri Cobben, 1982 i c g
 Saldula saltatoria (Linnaeus, 1758) i c g b  (common shorebug)
 Saldula sardoa Filippi, 1957 i c g
 Saldula scitula Drake and Hottes, 1950 i c g
 Saldula setulosa (Puton, 1880) i c g
 Saldula severini Harris, 1943 i c g
 Saldula sibiricola Cobben, 1985 i c g
 Saldula solomonensis Cobben, 1986 i c g
 Saldula sonneveldti Blöte, 1947 i c g
 Saldula subcarinata (China, 1924) i c g
 Saldula subsolans Drake and Hottes, 1950 i c g
 Saldula sulcicollis (Champion, 1900) i c g
 Saldula tahitiensis Cobben, 1961 i c g
 Saldula taiwanensis Cobben, 1985 i c g
 Saldula tuberculata Cobben, 1987 i c g
 Saldula uichancoi Drake and Viado, 1951 i c g
 Saldula usingeri J. Polhemus, 1967 i c g
 Saldula villosa (Hodgden, 1949) i c g
 Saldula waltoni Cobben and J. Polhemus, 1966 i c g
 Saldula xanthoa Cobben, 1987 i c g
 Saldula xanthochila (Fieber, 1859) i c g
 Saldula zairensis Cobben, 1987 i c g
 Saldula zena J. Polhemus, 1985 i c g

Data sources: i = ITIS, c = Catalogue of Life, g = GBIF, b = Bugguide.net

References

Saldula
Articles created by Qbugbot